Henry Noyes may refer to: 
Henry Noyes, co-founder of Australian engineering company Noyes Brothers
Henry Sanborn Noyes (1822–1870), president of Northwestern University
Henry Halsey Noyes (1910–2005), American writer, publisher, teacher, and distributor of Chinese books and magazines
Henry E. Noyes (1839–1919), United States Army officer

See also
Noyes (disambiguation)